None to Accompany Me is a 1994 novel by South African Nobel Winner Nadine Gordimer. The novel follows the motifs and plot framework of a Bildungsroman, exploring the development of the main character, Vera Stark. The novel is set during the early 1990s in South Africa after the release of Nelson Mandela.

The novel focuses on Stark shedding personal ties to find her "true self" in a political cause: fighting apartheid as a civil rights lawyer. Her decisions also affect her friends, a Black African family who had lived in political exile: Sibongile and Didymus Maqoma.

The first printing of the novel included 60,000 copies.

Style 
LA Times reviewer Richard Eder focused on the novel's political novel features, describing the novel as having hints of "Animal Farm foreboding". The novel uses the characters for exposition to create commentary on the new political situation of South Africa.

Critical reception 
Reviews of the novel were mixed. New York Times Books reviewer Michiko Kakutani wrote a lukewarm review, describing the novel as successfully profiling Grodimer's "psychological insight" while "the attempt in these pages to render a more realistic post-apartheid South Africa frequently feels pat and contrived." (emphasis original) Publishers Weekly was generally positive, describing the novel as "occasionally overdetermined by too many parallels and patterns, Gordimer's novel is powerfully complex and startling in its insights."

The LA Times review focuses on the effective impact of the novel as an exploration of Vera's development in a new post-apartheid political environment: ""No One to Accompany Me," alludes both to the waning of all white hegemonies, even that of heroic idealism, and the waning of old age. Gordimer's novel is prophetic, and it has the very still quality of what is already passing."

References

Further reading 

Novels by Nadine Gordimer
1994 novels
20th-century South African novels
Political novels